About Face is a 1952 musical film directed by Roy Del Ruth and starring Gordon MacRae and Eddie Bracken.

The movie was a flop. Bracken later said "the main reason why audiences rejected About Face, I think, is that most of us were too damn old for the roles."

Plot

Cast
Gordon MacRae as Tony Williams
Eddie Bracken as Biff Roberts
Dick Wesson as Dave Crouse
Virginia Gibson as Betty Long
Phyllis Kirk as Alice Wheatley
Aileen Stanley Jr. as Lorna Carter
Joel Grey as Bender
Larry Keating as Colonel Long
Cliff Ferre as Lieut. Jones
John Baer as Hal Carlton

References

External links

1952 films
Films directed by Roy Del Ruth
1952 romantic comedy films
Films scored by Paul Smith (film and television composer)
Warner Bros. films
1952 musical comedy films
American musical comedy films
American romantic comedy films
American romantic musical films
1950s English-language films
1950s American films